This is a list of the French SNEP Top 100 CD Singles, Top 50 Digital Singles and Top 150 albums number-ones of 2005.

Number-one by week

Singles chart

Albums chart

Top ten best sales
This is the ten best-selling singles and albums in 2005.

Singles

Albums

References

See also
2005 in music
List of number-one hits (France)
List of artists who reached number one on the French Singles Chart

Number-one singles
France singles
2005